The action of 19 August 1916 was one of two attempts in 1916 by the German High Seas Fleet to engage elements of the British Grand Fleet, following the mixed results of the Battle of Jutland, during the First World War. The lesson of Jutland for Germany had been the vital need for reconnaissance, to avoid the unexpected arrival of the Grand Fleet during a raid. Four Zeppelins were sent to scout the North Sea between Scotland and Norway for signs of British ships and four more scouted immediately ahead of German ships. Twenty-four German submarines kept watch off the English coast, in the southern North Sea and off the Dogger Bank.

Background
The Germans claimed victory at the Battle of Jutland (31 May to 1 June 1916) yet the commander of the High Seas Fleet, Admiral Reinhard Scheer, felt it important that another raid should be mounted as quickly as possible, to maintain morale in his severely battered fleet. It was decided that the raid should follow the pattern of previous ones, with the battlecruisers carrying out a dawn bombardment of an English town, in this case Sunderland. The remainder of the High Seas Fleet, comprising 15 dreadnought battleships, was to carry out close support  behind. The fleet sailed at 9:00 p.m. on 18 August from the Jade River.

Prelude

Naval Intelligence
Information about the raid was obtained by British Naval Intelligence (Room 40) through intercepted and decoded radio messages. Admiral Sir John Jellicoe, commander of the Grand Fleet, was on leave so had to be recalled urgently and boarded the light cruiser  at Dundee to meet his fleet in the early hours of 19 August off the River Tay. In his absence, Admiral Cecil Burney took the fleet to sea on the afternoon of 18 August. Vice-Admiral David Beatty left the Firth of Forth with his squadron of six battlecruisers to meet the main fleet  in the Long Forties.

The Harwich Force of twenty destroyers and five light cruisers (Commodore Reginald Tyrwhitt) was ordered out, as were 25 British submarines which were stationed in likely areas to intercept German ships. The battlecruisers together with the 5th Battle Squadron of five fast battleships were stationed  ahead of the main fleet to scout for the High Seas Fleet. The British moved south seeking the German fleet but suffered the loss of one of the light cruisers screening the battlecruiser group, which was hit by three torpedoes from submarine  at 6:00 a.m. and sunk.

Grand Fleet

At 6:15 a.m. Jellicoe received information from the Admiralty that one hour earlier the enemy had been  to his south east. The loss of Nottingham caused him to first head north for fear of endangering his other ships. No torpedo tracks or submarines had been seen, making it unclear whether the cause had been a submarine or a mine. He did not resume a south-easterly course until 9:00 a.m. when William Goodenough, commanding the light cruisers, advised that the cause had been a submarine attack. Further information from the Admiralty indicated that the battlecruisers would be within  of the main German fleet by 2:00 p.m. and Jellicoe increased to maximum speed. Weather conditions were good and there was still plenty of time for a fleet engagement before dark.

High Seas Fleet

The German force had received reassurances about Jellicoe's position, when a Zeppelin spotted the Grand Fleet heading north away from Scheer, at the time it had been avoiding the possible minefield. This was the sort of target Scheer was seeking, so he changed course at 12:15 p.m. also to the south-east and away from the approaching British fleet. The High Seas Fleet turned for home at 2:35 p.m. abandoning this potential target. By 4:00 p.m. Jellicoe had been advised that Scheer had abandoned the operation and so turned north himself.

Other engagements 
Taking the shortest route to the Humber put the ship on a bearing which took it along the Flamborough Head U-boat line. By  the Harwich force had sighted German ships but was too far behind to attack before nightfall and abandoned the chase.

Aftermath

On 13 September, a conference was held between Jellicoe and the Chief of the Admiralty War Staff, Vice-Admiral Sir Henry Oliver, on Iron Duke to discuss recent events. It was provisionally decided that it was unsafe to conduct fleet operations south of latitude 55.5° North (approximately level with Horns reef and where the battle of Jutland had taken place). Jellicoe took the view that a destroyer shortage precluded operations further south but that it was feasible to operate west of Longitude 4° East should there be a good opportunity of engaging the German fleet in daylight. The fleet should not sail further south than the Dogger Bank until a complete destroyer screen was available, except in exceptional circumstances, such as the chance to engage the High Seas Fleet with a tactical advantage or to intercept a German invasion fleet. On 23 September the Admiralty endorsed the conclusions of the meeting due to the effect of submarines and mines on surface ship operations. Scheer was unimpressed by the Zeppelin reconnaissance, only three had spotted anything and of their seven reports four had been wrong.

This was the last occasion on which the German fleet travelled so far west into the North Sea. On 6 October, the German government resumed attacks against merchant vessels by submarine, which meant the U-boat fleet was no longer available for combined attacks against surface vessels. From 18 to 19 October, Scheer led a brief sortie into the North Sea of which British intelligence gave advance warning; the Grand Fleet declined to prepare an ambush, staying in port with steam raised, ready to sail. The failure of these operations reinforced the belief, created at Jutland, that the risks were too great for such tactics, because of the danger from submarines and mines.

References

Citations

Bibliography

Further reading
 
 

Conflicts in 1916
Naval battles of World War I involving Germany
Naval battles of World War I involving the United Kingdom
North Sea operations of World War I
August 1916 events